Beverly Polcyn (September 13, 1927 – September 7, 2018) was an American actress.

She appeared in "Mama's Girls", a 1988 episode of the TV series Mama's Family, as one of senior tap dancing ladies.
 
Poclyn's first film appearance was in the 1991 horror movie Speak of the Devil where she played Ettie Glittens. She is mainly recognized for her appearance in Not Another Teen Movie, which resulted in a 2002 MTV Movie Awards "Best Kiss" nomination, along with Mia Kirshner. Additional roles include Date Movie where she plays the Old Cat Woman. In 2006, Polcyn appeared in an episode of Scrubs playing the part of a dyslexic woman.

Filmography
Speak of the Devil
Hook
The Beverly Hillbillies
Out to Sea
Not Another Teen Movie
The Sweetest Thing
Malcolm in the Middle
Monk
Scrubs
Date Movie
Boppin' at the Glue Factory
National Lampoon's Totally Baked: A Potumentary
Austin & Ally
Walk of Fame
 Bucky Larson: Born to Be a Star
 Airplane Mode
 Fred 3: Camp Fred

References

External links

The 2002 MTV Awards summary

Actresses from Alabama
American film actresses
2018 deaths
1927 births
21st-century American women